Hank Corwin is an American film editor. He has been nominated for three Oscars for editing the films The Big Short (2015), Vice (2018), and Don't Look Up (2021). In addition, he has been nominated for two BAFTA Awards for Best Editing. Other notable works include Natural Born Killers (1994), The Horse Whisperer (1998) and The Tree of Life (2011).

Filmography

As an editor

Other credits
 2011: Moneyball (additional editor)
 2009: Public Enemies (additional editor)
 2003: Poem: I Set My Feet Upon the Air and It Carries Me (guest editor)
 1999: Snow Falling on Cedars (sound designer)
 1998: Why Do Fools Fall in Love (additional editor)
 1997: Fast, Cheap & Out of Control (Documentary) (additional editor)
 1994: Natural Born Killers (actor, Headless Figure / Mickey's Dad Demon)
 1991: JFK (additional editor)

Accolades

Other
 2015: Seattle Film Critics Awards – The Big Short – Best Editing (nominated)
 2015: St. Louis Film Critics Association – The Big Short – Best Editing (nominated)
 2012: International Cinephile Society Awards – The Tree of Life – Best Editing (nominated)
 2012: Italian Online Movie Awards – The Tree of Life – Best Editing (Miglior montaggio) (nominated)
 2011: Online Film & Television Association – The Tree of Life – Best Editing (nominated)
 2011: Phoenix Film Critics Society Awards – The Tree of Life – Best Editing (nominated)
 1997: MTV Video Music Award for Best Editing – "Devils Haircut" by Beck (won)

References

External links
 

Year of birth missing (living people)
Living people
American film editors
Best Editing BAFTA Award winners